Close to Home is a 2005 Israeli drama film directed by Dalia Hager and Vidi Bilu, and starring Smadar Sayar and Naama Schedar. It is the first film about the experience of female soldiers in the Israel Defense Forces.

Smadar (Sayar) and Mirit (Schendar), both 18 years old, are assigned to patrol the streets of Jerusalem together as part of their military service. Worlds apart in their personality, their initial frosty relationship becomes a friendship as they deal with their own emotional issues, the crushes and break-ups in their love lives, as well as the political realities of the city in which they live.

The film premiered at the 2005 Jerusalem Film Festival. It also showed at the 56th Berlin International Film Festival where it was awarded a prize by the International Association of Art Film Houses.

See also
 Women's cinema

References

External links
 
 UK distributor Soda Pictures
 Official UK Myspace
 Close to Home - Karov Labait

2000s Hebrew-language films
2005 films
2005 drama films
Films about the Israel Defense Forces
Films set in Jerusalem
Israeli drama films